Saidowal lies on the Phillaur-Nurmahal Road. The nearest main road to Saidowal is Phillaur-Nurmahal road which is almost 2 km from the village. The nearest Railway station to this village is Gumtali Railway station about 4 km from the village.saidowal  
 
(31.09°N,75.65°E )saidowal is a village in Jalandhar district in the Indian state of Punjab. Saidowal is a clean, neat and small village as compared to the surrounding villages. The post office opened in around 1970. Till this day the mail to the neighboring villages is routed via Saidowal. At present saidowal has one of the biggest Gurudwara sahib in the region.which was built with the cost of over one cror.Saidowal is located near the circle of many major towns such as Nakodar (21 km), Jalandhar (33 km), Phagwara (22 km), Goraya (12 km), Phillaur(20 km) and Nurmahal (8 km).Ludhiana(35 km) "As of 2001[update] India census", Saidowall had a population of 729. Males constitute 53% of the population and females 47%. Saidowal has an average literacy rate of 67%, higher than the national average of 59.5%: male literacy is 71%, and female literacy is 70%. In saidowal, 12% of the population is under 6 years of age. Majority of the residents in the village follow Sikhism. The most common surname in the village is Randhawa with Basra and sidhu as well. Majority of population works in Agriculture industry.One of the Famous freedom fighter Ujaager singh randhawa hails from saidowal, he was one of the first Indians to go to uk . when shaheed Udham singh went to uk to kill Sandress and took the revenge of  "jalainwalla bagh kand" he kept Udham singh in his house and helped him in every possible way. so by this way Saidowal has also have  it's share in history of INDIA...

About 
Saidowal lies on the Phillaur–Nurmahal Road. The nearest main road to Saidowal is Phillaur–Nurmahal road which is almost 2 km from the village. The nearest railway station to this village is Gumtali Railway Station about 4 km from the village.

Saidowal is a clean, neat and small village as compared to the surrounding villages. The post office opened in around 1970. To this day the mail to the neighboring villages is routed via Saidowal. At present Saidowal has one of the biggest Gurudwara sahib in the region which was built with the cost of over one cror. Saidowal is located near the circle of many major towns such as Nakodar (21 km), Jalandhar (33 km), Phagwara (22 km), Goraya (12 km), Phillaur (20 km) and Nurmahal (8 km), Ludhiana (35 km).  India census, Saidowall had a population of 729. Males constitute 53% of the population and females 47%. Saidowal has an average literacy rate of 67%, higher than the national average of 59.5%: male literacy is 71%, and female literacy is 70%. In Saidowal, 12% of the population is under 6 years of age. Majority of the residents in the village follow Sikhism. The most common surname in the village is Randhawa with Basra and Sidhu as well. Majority of population works in agriculture.

One of The freedom fighters of Panjab S Pakhar Singh Randhawa S/O S Bhagat Singh Randhawa born 1911, V Saidowal, Teh, Phillaur Distt, Jalander, was in Hong Kong Police since 31 July 1937. Joined Indian National Army In Singapore and served as HAV.No60864. Was taken P.O.W.Kept in Red Fort Delhi. Released on 14 July 1946.

One of the famous freedom fighters, Ujaager Singh Randhawa, hails from Saidowal. He was one of the first Indians to go to the UK. when Shaheed Udham Singh went to UK to kill Sandress and took the revenge of  "jalainwalla bagh kand" he kept Udham Singh in his house and helped him in every possible way. So by this way Saidowal has also have  its share in history of India.

References

Villages in Jalandhar district